Philippe Durpes (born 6 March 1974 in Capesterre) is a football defender from Guadeloupe, France.

He plays for French Championnat National club SO Romorantin and has represented the Guadeloupe national football team once, against Costa Rica in 2007.

External links 
 Player profile - SO Romorantin
 

1974 births
Living people
French footballers
Association football defenders
RC Lens players
Cercle Brugge K.S.V. players
Amiens SC players
Guadeloupean footballers
2007 CONCACAF Gold Cup players
Expatriate footballers in Belgium
SO Romorantin players
Guadeloupe international footballers